Werner is a prominent lunar impact crater that lies in the rugged south-central highlands of the Moon. It was named after the 15th-century German mathematician and astronomer Johannes Werner. It is almost joined with the crater Aliacensis to the southeast, and the pair form a rugged valley in the intervening gap. Due west of Werner is the distorted Regiomontanus, and to the north is the remains of Blanchinus. It is from the Eratosthenian period, which lasted from 3.2 to 1.1 billion years ago.

The rim of Werner shows little appearance of wear, and is much younger and less eroded than the other large craters in the surroundings. The interior wall is terraced, and there is a noticeable rampart on the exterior. There are several low rises on the crater floor and a notable central peak. Its highly terraced walls attain peaks of almost 1,500 feet. The crater is 45 miles (70 kilometers) in diameter, and the difference in height between its rim and its deepest parts is 4.2 kilometers.

Near the Werner crater, a chiaroscuro effect created by the dark craters and their lit rims is visible for several hours before first quarter forms an X.

Satellite craters

By convention these features are identified on lunar maps by placing the letter on the side of the crater midpoint that is closest to Werner.

References

External links

Impact craters on the Moon
Eratosthenian